Candice Pierucci is an American politician serving in the Utah House of Representatives, representing District 49, which includes portions of Herriman and Riverton, Utah. At the time of her appointment, she was the youngest member of the Utah Legislature.

Early life and career
Pierucci lives in Riverton and grew up in Herriman. She graduated from Utah Valley University with a bachelor's degree in political science, and a masters' in public administration from the University of Utah.

Political career
Prior to her appointment to the legislature, Pierucci interned in the Washington, D.C. office of Sen. Mike Lee, R-Utah, worked for Rep. Chris Stewart, R-Utah, and as development director for the Sutherland Institute, a conservative think tank.

Pierucci currently serves as chair of the Utah House Education Committee.

Personal life
Pierucci is married to Andy Pierucci.  They have one child.

References

Living people
Women state legislators in Utah
Republican Party members of the Utah House of Representatives
Year of birth missing (living people)
Brigham Young University alumni
21st-century American politicians
21st-century American women politicians